Frank Higgins may refer to:

 Frank E. Higgins (1865–1915), Canadian evangelist
 Frank G. Higgins (1864–1905), Montana politician
 Frank W. Higgins (1856–1907), New York politician

See also
 
 Francis Higgins (disambiguation)